Nina Larsson (born 28 September 1966 in Vänersborg) is a Swedish Liberal People's Party politician. She was a member of the Riksdag from 2006 to 2014 and party secretary of her party from 2010 to 2014.

External links
Nina Larsson at the Riksdag website

1976 births
Living people
People from Vänersborg Municipality
Members of the Riksdag from the Liberals (Sweden)
Women members of the Riksdag
21st-century Swedish women politicians